The 2022–23 Belgian Cup, called the Croky Cup for sponsorship reasons, is the 68th season of Belgium's annual football cup competition. The competition will begin on 24 July 2022 and will end with the final on 30 April 2023. The winners of the competition will qualify for the 2023–24 UEFA Europa League play-off round.

Match times up to 30 October 2022 and from 26 March 2023 were CEST (UTC+2). Times on interim ("winter") days were CET (UTC+1).

Competition format
The competition consists of one preliminary round, followed by ten proper rounds. All rounds are single-match elimination rounds. When tied after 90 minutes in the first three rounds, penalties will be taken immediately. From round four, when tied after 90 minutes first an extra time period of 30 minutes will be played, then penalties are to be taken if still necessary.

Teams will enter the competition in different rounds, based upon their 2022–23 league affiliation. Teams from the fifth-level Belgian Division 3 or lower will begin in round 1, with the exception of sixteen teams from the Belgian Provincial Leagues which were randomly drawn to start in the preliminary round. Belgian Division 2 teams entered in round 2, Belgian National Division 1 teams entered in round 3, Belgian First Division B teams in round 5 and finally the Belgian First Division A teams entered in round 6. U23 teams are not eligible for the Belgian Cup and will not enter the cup.

Round and draw dates

Preliminary round
This round of matches was played on 24 July 2022 and included sixteen teams playing in the Belgian Provincial Leagues.

First round
This round of matches was played on 31 July 2022.

Second round
This round of matches was played on 6 and 7 August 2022.

Third round
This round of matches was played on 13, 14 and 16 August 2022.

Fourth round
This round of matches was played on 20, 21 and 23 August 2022

Fifth round
This round of matches was played between 27 August 2022 and 25 September 2022

Sixth round
The draw for the sixth round was made on 28 September 2022, a few days after the conclusion of the last match of the previous round. Newly entering this round were the teams from the Belgian First Division A, with the exception of Westerlo and Seraing which had entered in the prior round. The 16 teams entering at this stage were seeded and could not meet each other. The lowest teams still in the competition were Cappellen, Lokeren-Temse and Meux, from the Belgian Division 2 (tier 4).

Seventh round 
This round of matches was played on 20, 21 and 22 December 2022. The draw took place on 10 November 2022 after the conclusion of the last game, which was Lierse Kempenzonen against Anderlecht. All teams left played in the Jupiler Pro League, apart from KMSK Deinze who played in the Challenger Pro League (2nd level).

Quarter-finals
The draw for the quarter-finals was made on Thursday 22 December, one day after the conclusion of the last match of the previous round. All teams left played at the top level (Belgian Pro League).

Semi-finals
The draw for the semi-finals was made on Friday 13 January, one day after the conclusion of the last match of the previous round.

First legs

Second legs

Final

References

Belgian Cup seasons
Belgian Cup
Cup